Jalen Adaway (born July 9, 1998) is an American professional basketball player who last played for the Austin Spurs of the NBA G League. He played college basketball for the Miami RedHawks and the St. Bonaventure Bonnies.

High school career
Adaway attended Logansport High School. He averaged 15.7 points, 8.0 rebounds, 3.4 assists, 2.5 blocks and 1.1 steals per game as a senior to lead the Berries to a 23–2 record. Adaway was named to the Indiana All-Star team. He posted 1,446 points and 655 rebounds in his career. Adaway committed to play college basketball at Miami (OH).

College career
As a freshman, Adaway averaged 8.5 points and 5.0 rebounds per game. He averaged 7.5 points and 5.0 rebounds per game as a sophomore. Following the season, he transferred to St. Bonaventure and sat out a year per NCAA regulations. Adaway averaged 12.2 points and 6.0 rebounds per game as a junior, helping the Bonnies to win their first Atlantic 10 Conference Tournament since 2012 and receive an automatic berth to the NCAA Tournament. As a senior, he averaged 15.3 points and 5.9 rebounds per game while shooting a career-high 37.6% from three-point range, earning First Team All-Atlantic 10 honors. Adaway decided to forgo his final season of eligibility granted due to the COVID-19 pandemic and turn professional.

Professional career
After not being selected in the 2022 NBA draft, Adaway joined the Miami Heat for NBA Summer League. He signed an Exhibit 10 deal with the San Antonio Spurs on August 31, 2022. Adaway subsequently joined the Austin Spurs. He was waived on February 11, 2023.

References

External links
St. Bonaventure Bonnies bio
Miami RedHawks bio

1998 births
Living people
American men's basketball players
Austin Spurs players
Basketball players from Indiana
Miami RedHawks men's basketball players
St. Bonaventure Bonnies men's basketball players
People from Logansport, Indiana